The non-marine mollusks of Puerto Rico are a part of the molluscan fauna of Puerto Rico. A number of species of non-marine mollusks are found in the wild in Puerto Rico.

Robert James Shuttleworth has described 3 genera and 25 species from Puerto Rico as new in 1854.

Freshwater gastropods 
Thiaridae
 Tarebia granifera (Lamarck, 1822)

Land gastropods 

Amphibulimidae
 genus Gaeotis Shuttleworth, 1854 is endemic to Puerto Rico

Sagdidae
 Polydontes acutangula Burrow, 1815

Succineidae
 Succinea approximans Shuttleworth, 1854

Veronicellidae
 Veronicella portoricensis (Semper, 1885)

Freshwater bivalves

See also
 List of marine molluscs of Puerto Rico

Lists of molluscs of surrounding countries:
 List of non-marine molluscs of the United States
 List of non-marine molluscs of Dominican Republic
 List of non-marine molluscs of the Virgin Islands

References

Further reading  
 Grana F. A. (2007). "Nomenclatura de los organismos acuáticos y marinos de Puerto Rico e Islas Vírgenes. Vol. 6: Moluscos de Puerto Rico e Islas Vírgenes, parte 5". PDF.
 Harry H. W. (1964). "The foreign freshwater snails now established in Puerto Rico" (abstract). American Malac. Union. An. Rep. 1964: 4–5.
  Gundlach J. (1883). Apuntes para la fauna Puerto-Riqueña [Notes for Puerto-Rican fauna]. Memorias de Historia Natural 4: 5-58; 5: 441–484.
 van der Schalie H. (1948). "The land and fresh-water mollusks of Puerto Rico". Miscellaneous Publications, Museum of Zoology, University of Michigan 70: 134 pp. http://hdl.handle.net/2027.42/56315 PDF.
 Richards C. S. (1964). "Puerto Rican species of Tropicorbis and Drepanotrema. Comparison with Australorbis glabratus and other Planorbids". Malacologia 2(1): 105–129.

Molluscs
Molluscs
Puerto Rico
Puerto Rico
.Puerto Rico
Puerto Rico